Red Partisans is a 1924 Soviet silent war film directed by Vyacheslav Viskovsky.

The film's art direction was by Vladimir Yegorov and Yevgeni Yenej.

Plot
In Siberia under occupation of the Whites, on the orders of Admiral Kolchak house searches and mass arrests of the Bolsheviks take place. The underground party committee entrusts Bolshevik worker Tokarev who managed to avoid arrest organization of a guerrilla unit in the taiga.

Meanwhile the White Guards occupy one of the Siberian villages, Zubarevka. Violence and looting commences. Peasant Stepan Dolgov when protecting his wife from harassment of an officer kills him and goes into the taiga. Here he meets with Tokarev. Later they are joined by a group of peasants who have fled from Kolchak. Tokarev and Dolgov form a small guerrilla unit made out of fugitives ...

Cast
 Nikolay Dirin as Officer  
 Mikhail Lomakin 
 Nikolai Simonov 
 Valeri Solovtsov

References

Bibliography 
 Christie, Ian & Taylor, Richard. The Film Factory: Russian and Soviet Cinema in Documents 1896-1939. Routledge, 2012.

External links 
 

1924 films
1920s war drama films
Soviet war drama films
Soviet silent films
1920s Russian-language films
Soviet black-and-white films
1924 drama films
Silent war drama films